Shepherd Skanes is an American football coach. Skanes served as head coach at Concordia–Selma from 2005 to 2012 where he compiled an overall record of 33–40. He presently serves as the defensive line coach for Morehouse.

Coaching career
Skanes served as the first head football coach for the Concordia Hornets located in Selma, Alabama (sometimes called "Concordia–Alabama") and held that position from when the program began in 2005 through the third game of their 2012 season. His coaching record at Concordia was 33 wins and 40 losses.  As coach, Skanes gained respect of other regional coaches for his ability to work and build a program with comparatively less resources than his peers.

Head coaching record

References
			

Year of birth missing (living people)
Living people
Concordia College (Alabama) Hornets football coaches
Morehouse Maroon Tigers football coaches